William Dudley Pelley (March 12, 1890 – June 30, 1965) was an American fascist leader, occultist, spiritualist and writer.

Pelley came to prominence as a writer, winning two O. Henry Awards and penning screenplays for Hollywood films. His 1929 essay "Seven Minutes in Eternity" marked a turning point in his career, published in The American Magazine as a popular example of what would later be called a near-death experience. His antisemitism led him to found the Silver Legion of America in 1933, a fascist paramilitary league. He ran for president of the United States in 1936 as the candidate for the Christian Party.

Pelley was sentenced to 15 years in prison for sedition in 1942, and released in 1950. Upon his death, The New York Times assessed him as "an agitator without a significant following".

Early life
Born in Lynn, Massachusetts, William Dudley Pelley grew up in poverty, the son of William George Apsey Pelley and his wife, Grace (née Goodale). His father was initially a Southern Methodist Church minister, and was later a small businessman and shoemaker.

Early career
Largely self-educated, Pelley became a journalist and gained respect for his writing skills; his articles eventually appeared in national publications such as The Chicago Tribune. Two of his short stories received O. Henry awards: "The Face in the Window" in 1920 and "The Continental Angle" in 1930. He was hired by the Methodist Centenary to study Methodist missions around the world. He joined the Red Cross in Siberia, where he helped the White Russians during the Russian Civil War. His opposition to Communism grew, and he began to subscribe to the conspiracy theory of Jewish Communism. Upon returning to the United States in 1920, Pelley wrote novels and short stories in addition to his journalism, and went to Hollywood, where he became a screenwriter, writing the Lon Chaney films The Light in the Dark (1922) and The Shock (1923). Pelley became disillusioned with the film industry. What he regarded as unfair treatment by Jewish studio executives increased his antisemitic inclinations. He moved to New York, and then to Asheville, North Carolina in 1932, and began publishing magazines and essays detailing his new religious system, the "Liberation Doctrine".

Spiritualism
In May 1928, Pelley gained notoriety when he claimed he had an out-of-body experience in which he traveled to other planes of existence devoid of corporeal souls. He described his experience in an article titled "My Seven Minutes in Eternity", published in book form in 1933 as Seven Minutes in Eternity: With the Aftermath, originally probably appearing in The American Magazine in the late 1920s. In later writings, he described the experience as "hypo-dimensional". He wrote that during this event, he met with God and Jesus, who instructed him to undertake the spiritual transformation of America. He later claimed that the experience gave him the ability to levitate, see through walls, and have out-of-body experiences at will. His metaphysical writings greatly boosted his public visibility. Some of the early members of the original Ascended Master Teachings religion, the "I AM" Activity, were recruited from the ranks of Pelley's organization, the Silver Legion of America. Pelley's religious system was a mixture of theosophy, spiritualism, Rosicrucianism, and pyramidism. He considered it to be a perfected form of Christianity, in which "Dark Souls" (Jews, Communists and Papists) represented the forces of evil.

Political activism
When the Great Depression struck America in 1929, Pelley became active in politics. After moving to Asheville, Pelley founded Galahad College in 1932. The college specialized in correspondence courses on "Social Metaphysics" and "Christian Economics." He also founded Galahad Press, which he used to publish various political and metaphysical magazines, newspapers, and books. On January 30, 1933, Adolf Hitler became chancellor of Germany. Pelley, an admirer of Hitler, founded the Silver Legion, an antisemitic organization whose members, known as Silver Shirts and Christian Patriots, wore Nazi-style silver uniform shirts. Their insignia was a scarlet L, emblazoned on their flags and uniforms. Biographer Scott Beekman noted that Pelley was "one of the first Americans to create an organization celebrating the work of Adolf Hitler."

Pelley traveled throughout the United States, holding recruitment rallies, lectures, and public speeches. He founded Silver Legion chapters in almost every state in the country. Membership peaked at 15,000 in 1935, dropping to below 5,000 by 1938. His political ideology consisted of anti-Communism, antisemitism, patriotism, corporatism, isolationism, and British Israelism, themes which were the primary focus of his numerous magazines and newspapers which included Liberation, Pelley's Silvershirt Weekly, The Galilean, and The New Liberator. He became fairly well known as the 1930s went on. Sinclair Lewis mentioned him by name in his novel It Can't Happen Here (1935) about a fascist takeover in the U.S. Pelley is praised by the leader of the fictional movement as an important precursor.

Pelley opposed Franklin Delano Roosevelt and the New Deal. He founded the Christian Party in 1935, and ran an unsuccessful campaign as candidate for president in 1936, winning only 1,600 votes. He engaged in a long dispute with the United States House of Representatives' Dies Committee, predecessor to the House Un-American Activities Committee. In 1940, federal marshals conducted a raid on Pelley's headquarters in Asheville, arresting his followers and seizing his property.

Despite serious financial and material setbacks within his organization which resulted from lengthy court battles, Pelley continued to oppose Roosevelt, especially as diplomatic relations between the United States and the Empire of Japan and Nazi Germany became strained in the early 1940s. Pelley accused Roosevelt of being a warmonger and advocated isolationism. Roosevelt enlisted J. Edgar Hoover and the FBI to investigate Pelley. Subsequently, the FBI interviewed subscribers to Pelley's newspapers and magazines.

Although the attack on Pearl Harbor in December 1941 led Pelley to disband the Silver Legion, he continued to attack the government in his magazine, Roll Call, which alarmed Roosevelt, Attorney General Francis Biddle, and the House Un-American Activities Committee. After stating in one issue of Roll Call that the devastation of the Pacific Fleet at Pearl Harbor was worse than the government claimed, Pelley was arrested at his new base of operations in Noblesville, Indiana, and in April 1942, he was charged with 12 counts of treason and sedition. One charge was dropped, but he was tried in Indiana and convicted of the other 11 charges, mostly for making seditious statements and for obstructing military recruiting and fomenting insurrection within the military. Pelley was sentenced to 15 years in prison. After serving eight years, he was paroled and released in 1950. While still incarcerated, he was one of 30 defendants in the "Mass Sedition Trial" of Nazi sympathizers which culminated in a mistrial after the death of the judge, Edward C. Eicher, in November 1944.

Later life
In his final years, Pelley dealt with charges of securities fraud that had been brought against him while he was living in Asheville.

The terms of Pelley's parole stipulated that he remain in central Indiana, and desist from all political activity. He developed an elaborate religious philosophy called "Soulcraft" based on his belief in UFOs and extraterrestrials, and published Star Guests in 1950. Pelley died at his home in Noblesville, Indiana on June 30, 1965.

Filmography

A Case at Law (1917)
One-Thing-at-a-Time O'Day (1919)
What Women Love (1920)
The Light in the Dark (1922)
Back Fire (1922)
The Fog (1923)
As a Man Lives (1923)
Her Fatal Millions (1923)
The Shock (1923)
Ladies to Board (1924)
The Sawdust Trail (1924)
Torment (1924)
The Ladybird (1927)
The Sunset Derby (1927)
Come Across (1929)
Drag (1929)
Courtin' Wildcats (1929)

References

Notes

Bibliography
 Abella, Alex and Scott Gordon. Shadow Enemies. Guilford, Connecticut: The Lyons Press, 2002, .
 Beekman, Scott. William Dudley Pelley: A Life in Right-wing Extremism and the Occult. Syracuse University Press, 2005. .

External links

 
 
 Jon Elliston, "New Age Nazi: The Rise and Fall of Asheville's Flaky Fascist", Mountain Xpress, January 28, 2004
 The Greater Glory, a novel by Pelley at archive.org
 The Fog, a novel by Pelley at archive.org
 William Dudley Pelley discussed in Episode 3, Episode 7, and Episode 8 of Rachel Maddow's Ultra podcast (2022)

1890 births
1965 deaths
Candidates in the 1936 United States presidential election
20th-century American politicians
20th-century far-right politicians in the United States
American anti-war activists
American collaborators with Nazi Germany
American anti-communists
American fascists
American prisoners and detainees
American male screenwriters
Christian fascists
Old Right (United States)
People from Lynn, Massachusetts
People from Noblesville, Indiana
Screenwriters from Massachusetts
Screenwriters from Indiana
Screenwriters from North Carolina
Writers from Asheville, North Carolina
Fascist politicians
20th-century American male writers
20th-century American screenwriters
Activists from North Carolina
Activists from Indiana
Prisoners and detainees of the United States federal government
People convicted of sedition